Dominique Visse (born 30 August 1955) is a French countertenor and founder of the Ensemble Clément Janequin.

Life and career
Dominique Visse was a chorister at the Notre-Dame de Paris and studied organ and flute at the Versailles Conservatory. As a musician, he developed an interest in Medieval and Renaissance repertories. After studying with Alfred Deller and René Jacobs from 1976 to 1978, he made his opera debut at Tourcoing in Monteverdi's L'incoronazione di Poppea in 1982.

Visse devotes himself to performing of secular and religious music of the Renaissance. He is also known for his interpretations of the Parisian chansons.

Visse is married to soprano Agnès Mellon.

Selected discography
Opera
 Purcell: Dido and Aeneas
 Monteverdi: Il ritorno d'Ulisse in patria
 Handel: Giulio Cesare 
 Handel: Ottone  
 Handel: Rinaldo
Charpentier Actéon H.481
 Charpentier: David et Jonathas H.490
 Charpentier: Le Malade imaginaire H.495

 Hasse: Cleofide
 Vivaldi: L'incoronazione di Dario
 Vivaldi: Montezuma 
 Sartorio: Giulio Cesare  
 Cavalli: La Calisto
 Poulenc: Le Gendarme incompris
 Zamponi: Ulisse all'isola di Circe

Recitals
 Charpentier: "Motets à double Choeur"  H.403, H.404, H.135, H.136, H.137, H.392, H.410, H.167, conducted by Ton Koopman (2 CD Erato 1992)
Charpentier: "Vêpres Solennelles"  H.540, H.190, H.50, H.149, H.52, H.150, H.51, H.161, H.191, H.65, H.77, conducted by Jean-Claude Malgoire (2 CD CBS Sony 1987)
Songs for Seven Centuries – Machaut to Ferrero, with Éric Bellocq (lute) and Kazuoki Fujii (piano)
 Campra – French Cantatas. Jill Feldman, Dominique Visse, Jean-François Gardeil
 The Three Countertenors – Andreas Scholl, Pascal Bertin
 with Agnès Mellon; "Parole e Querele d'Amore", Madrigali a due voci, Zigzag, 2011
 Takemitsu – Songs
 Bach. Café Zimmermann. Alpha
 Dom Quichotte Cantatas & Comic Concertos, Céline Frisch, Café Zimmermann
 Vinum et Musica – Capella de la Torre.

References

External links
Official web site

Operatic countertenors
20th-century French male opera singers
French countertenors
Living people
1955 births
People from Lisieux
Harmonia Mundi artists
21st-century French male opera singers